Brezany is a village and municipality in Žilina District in the Žilina Region of northern Slovakia.

History
In historical records the village was first mentioned in 1393.

The records for genealogical research are available at the state archive "Statny Archiv in Bytca, Slovakia"
 Roman Catholic church records (births/marriages/deaths): 1725-1925 (parish B)

Geography
The municipality lies at an altitude of 390 metres and covers an area of 3.656 km². It has a population of about 460 people.

See also
 List of municipalities and towns in Slovakia

External links
https://web.archive.org/web/20071027094149/http://www.statistics.sk/mosmis/eng/run.html
https://web.archive.org/web/20070513023228/http://www.statistics.sk/mosmis/eng/run.html
Surnames of living people in Brezany

Villages and municipalities in Žilina District

hu:Sárosbuják
sk:Brezany